Kenki (written: 賢希, 堅樹 or 顕貴) is a masculine Japanese given name. Notable people with the name include:

, Japanese rugby union player
, Japanese equestrian
, Japanese pirate
, Degenerate

Japanese masculine given names